The Treasure of the Humble is a collection of thirteen deeply reflective mystical essays by the Belgian Nobel Laureate Maurice Maeterlinck. The work is dedicated to Georgette Leblanc.

Essays
 "Le Silence" ("Silence")
 "Le Réveil de L'Ame" ("The Awakening of the Soul")
 "Les Avertis" ("The Pre-Destined")
 "La Morale Mystique" ("Mystic Morality")
 "Sur Les Femmes" ("On Women")
 "Ruysbroeck L'Admirable"
 "Emerson"
 "Novalis"
 "Le Tragique Quotidien" ("The Tragical in Daily Life")
 "L'Étoile" ("The Star")
 "La Bonté Invisible" ("The Invisible Goodness")
 "La Vie Profonde" ("The Deeper Life")
 "La Beauté Intérieure" ("The Inner Beauty")

English translations
The Treasure of the Humble was translated into English by Alfred Sutro with an introduction by A. B. Walkley in 1897. The English-language version does not include the essays on Ruysbroeck, Emerson, and Novalis.

References
 Maeterlinck, Maurice (1900). The Treasure of the Humble. New York: Dodd, Mead & Company/London: George Allen, Ruskin House.
 Maeterlinck, Maurice (1907). Le Trésor des Humbles. Paris: Société du Mercure de France.

External links
Chapter X of Edward Thomas' Maurice Materlinck, entitled "First Essays: 'Le Trésor des Humbles'; 'La Sagesse et la Destinée'"

Books by Maurice Maeterlinck
1896 non-fiction books
Essay collections